Donnington is a hamlet in the English county of Shropshire. It forms part of the civil parish of Wroxeter and Uppington.

The hamlet contained a now defunct 'free grammar school' under patronage of the Newport family during the 17th and 18th centuries whose pupils included Royalist divine Richard Allestree and Puritan divine Richard Baxter, the latter of whom taught at the school for three months.  Welsh poet Goronwy Owen was master at the school as well as curate at Uppington, from 1748 to 1753.

References

External links 

Hamlets in Shropshire